Poova Thalaiya is a 2011 Indian Tamil-language action film produced, written and directed by Sanjay Ram. The film stars Krishnakumar, Udhaya, Vaali, Sherin Shringar and Megha Nair. The film was theatrically released in India on 29 April 2011.

Cast 
 Krishnakumar
 Udhaya
 Vaali
 Sherin Shringar
Megha Nair
 Swetha
 Deepan Chakravarthy
 Dhandapani
 Alex

Production 
Newcomer Krishnakumar was signed on to play the lead role alongside Udhaya, while debutant Vaali, a close friend of Sanjay Ram was also cast in the film. In August 2008, the film was ready to be released by 15 August, but the project was subsequently delayed.

The film went through a change of producer with Sanjay Ram replacing Balu Poththan and Ram Prakash. Prior to the release of the film, Sherin lodged a complaint with the Nadigar Sangam stating that she had not finished shooting for her parts in the film and that the director was trying to release a film with a different script to the original pitched to her. She suggested that the producer Sanjay Ram had "played dirty" and the team were releasing the film without paying her acting fee.

Soundtrack

Release
The film subsequently had a low key release on 29 April 2011 and went unnoticed at the box office. Nowrunning wrote "Poova thalaiya is a morbidly grotesque gangster film with exaggerated cartoon characters planning and executing the art of murder."

References 

2011 films
2010s Tamil-language films
Indian action films
Indian gangster films
Films directed by Sanjay Ram
2011 action films